Arnaud Boetsch and Guy Forget were the defending champions, but lost in the round robin.

Goran Ivanišević and Michael Stich won in the final 6–1, 7–6(5), against Richard Krajicek and Emilio Sánchez.

Draw

Final

Group A
Standings are determined by: 1. number of wins; 2. number of matches; 3. in three-players-ties, percentage of sets won, or of games won; 4. steering-committee decision.

Group B
Standings are determined by: 1. number of wins; 2. number of matches; 3. in three-players-ties, percentage of sets won, or of games won; 4. steering-committee decision.

External links
Completed matches

Legends Under 45 Doubles